Since 1857, a series of obscenity laws known as the Obscene Publications Acts have governed what can be published in England and Wales. The classic definition of criminal obscenity is if it "tends to deprave and corrupt," stated in 1868 by Lord Justice Cockburn, in Regina v. Hicklin, now known as the Hicklin test.

Timeline of legislation

There have been several Acts of Parliament of this name: 
 Obscene Publications Act 1857
 Obscene Publications Act 1959
 Obscene Publications Act 1964

Of these, only the 1959 and 1964 acts are still in force in England and Wales, as amended by more recent legislation. They define the legal bounds of obscenity in England and Wales, and are used to enforce the removal of obscene material. Irish law diverged from English law in 1929, replacing the OPA 1857 with a new Irish act.

Key cases under the Obscene Publications Act

Scottish prohibitions on obscene material are to be found in section 51 of the Civic Government (Scotland) Act 1982.

See also 
 Censorship in the United Kingdom
 Pornography in the United Kingdom
 Section 63 of the Criminal Justice and Immigration Act 2008 – defines 'extreme pornography' and details offences

References

External links
 Article on the Acts
 Conditions of Charge for Obscene material

Laws in the United Kingdom
Obscenity law
Book censorship in the United Kingdom
Acts of the Parliament of the United Kingdom
United Kingdom pornography law